Thomas "Bomber" Kavanagh is an Irish criminal and a senior member of the Kinahan Organised Crime Group founded by Christy Kinahan.

He was one of the first targets of the Criminal Assets Bureau (CAB) when it was established.

Byrne organised crime
He is a member of the Byrne organised crime group, a branch of the Kinahan crime organisation. Originally led by Christy Kinahan, it was then led by Freddie Thompson, then by Kavanagh's brother-in-law Liam Byrne. He also has influence with the Dubai-based leadership of organisation.

In 1990 he was found guilty of a firearms offence that led to a seven-year term in an Irish prison.

In July 1999 CAB secured an order against Kavanagh for IR £106,000 for unpaid taxes on income the bureau said was derived from criminal activity.
His house on Knocknarea Avenue, Drimnagh was seized.

In October 2000 he was one of a group of people who assaulted a witness in the Four Courts who had testified against Liam Byrne.

In 2018 he attended the funeral of his brother-in-law David Byrne who had been shot dead as part of the Hutch-Kinahan feud.

Move to UK
He moved to the UK after 2000 and settled in Tamworth. Christy Kinahan had previously settled in this town when he first left Ireland.

He has his own gang based in Birmingham.

Car dealership
Like his brother-in-law, he runs a luxury car dealership in the UK.

Gardaí believe that the dealership is a front for laundering drug money and that cars have been exchanged between criminal-owned companies as payment for drugs. It also allows a group of criminals in England and Ireland to have access to luxury cars which they do not own and cannot be seized from them.

Convictions in UK
In 2017 he was given a sixteen month suspended sentence for failing to declare taxable income and supplying false payslips to secure a mortgage.

In September 2019 he was jailed at Stoke-on-Trent Crown Court for three years at for possessing a 10,000-volt stun gun disguised as a torch along with other weaponry found in his house. During the trial it emerged that an Osman warning had been issued to him in early 2018.

In July 2020 Thomas Kavanagh, along with Gary Vickery and Daniel Canning pleaded guilty to drugs and money-laundering offences at Ipswich Crown Court.

In March 2022 Kavanagh, Vickery and Canning were jailed for 21 years, 20 years and 19 years six months respectively. The judge said that all three of the men had played a leading role in the criminal organisation. He also said that they could be released on licence, by which time Kavanagh will be 65.

The deputy director of the National Crime Agency said that they had dismantled the Kinahan operation in the UK and that the proceeds of crime investigation into the assets and financing of the gang continued.

Criminal Assets Bureau
In March 2022 it was revealed that the Criminal Assets Bureau was pursuing a case against Kavanagh, as well as Jim Mansfield Jnr and Daniel Kinahan. The case has been pursued for over a year in secret, with Mansfield as the main target, with Kavanagh and Kinahan, among others, as respondents.

References

Irish gangsters
Living people
Year of birth missing (living people)
Kinahan Organised Crime Group